Duff Post (May 19, 1854 – May 19, 1915) was a dentist and once the mayor of Tampa, Florida.

Early life 
Duff Post was born on May 19, 1854 in Tampa, Florida. He was the son of the 5th mayor of Tampa, Madison Post. Post would attend local schools before going onto study at the Philadelphia Dental College to obtain a dentistry degree.

Dentistry 
Post would establish his dentistry practice in Tampa once graduating from college. Upon leaving office in 1892 he returned to his dentistry practice.

Tampa politics 
From there he'd first get involved with local politics and business.  Post's first political office he would hold would be the President of the Hillsborough County Board of Health in 1873. He would serve as Tampa's City Marshal from 1881 to 1883, and was Captain in the 4th Regiment of the Florida Militia.

Mayor 
As mayor, he would prioritize much of his overall work towards improving the city's sanitation.

He was first elected mayor on August 14, 1883 and served until August 13, 1886 (three consecutive one-year terms). Duff would be the second native of Tampa to hold that office. He was elected again to a second term on March 4, 1891 and served until March 4, 1892.

Postmaster 
He is also known to have been Tampa's postmaster from 1893 to 1897 as well.

Rail 
Post was involved in effort to bring rail service to Tampa and helped extend Henry Plant's Steamship Company contracts for service in Tampa.

Personal 
He opened an ice cream parlor and restaurant in the Masonic Lodge Building in downtown Tampa on March 31, 1877. He married Alberti Johnson in Tampa on January 3, 1879.

Post would die in Tampa on May 19, 1915.

Additional sources
Covington, Dr. James W. and Wavering, Debbie Lee, "The Mayors of Tampa: A Brief Administrative History," Tampa, FL: University of Tampa, 1987.
Grismer, Karl H., Tampa: A History of the City and the Tampa Bay Region of Florida, St. Petersburg Printing Company, FL, 1950.
Robinson, Ernest L., History of Hillsborough County, Florida: Narrative and Biographical, The Record Company, St. Augustine, FL, 1928.
Tampa Council Minutes, City of Tampa Archives, Tampa

References

Mayors of Tampa, Florida
Florida Democrats
American dentists
1854 births
1915 deaths
19th-century dentists